Baldur Springmann (31 May 1912 – 24 October 2003) was a German organic farmer, publicist, and neo-nazi politician. One of the pioneers of the environmentalist movement in West Germany, Springmann helped found the The Greens before withdrawing to involve himself in right-wing extremism.

Springmann is considered an important figure in ecofascist ideology.

Early life and military career 
Springmann was born in Hagen in 1912.

During the Second World War, Springmann was a member of the SS.

Involvement in Green politics 
Springmann was a founding member of The Greens.

Far-right extremism 
Today, Springmann is viewed positively by the neo-nazi National Democratic Party.

Death and legacy

References 

1912 births
2003 deaths
German farmers
Ecological Democratic Party politicians
German politicians
Nazi Party members
SS personnel
Sturmabteilung personnel
Stahlhelm members
German neo-Nazis
Alliance 90/The Greens politicians